Philip Thompson (August 20, 1789 – November 25, 1836) was a member of the U.S. representative from Kentucky.

Born in Mercer County, near Harrodsburg, Kentucky, Thompson received a limited education.
He served as a lieutenant in the War of 1812 with 10th Company of the Barbour's Regiment, Kentucky Volunteer Militia.
He held several local offices and practiced law. He was admitted to the bar and commenced practice in Hartford, Ohio County, Kentucky.
He moved to Owensboro, Kentucky.
He served as member of the State house of representatives.

Thompson was elected as an Adams-Clay Republican to the Eighteenth Congress (March 4, 1823 – March 3, 1825).
He resumed the practice of law in Owensburg, Kentucky, where he died November 25, 1836.
He was interred in the Moseley burying ground on Firth Street.
He was reinterred in Rural Hill (later Rosehill Elmwood) Cemetery in 1856.

References

External links

1789 births
1836 deaths
American militia officers
Democratic-Republican Party members of the United States House of Representatives from Kentucky
Members of the Kentucky House of Representatives
19th-century American politicians